Challenger is the eighth studio album by Burning Star Core, released on April 29, 2008  by Hospital Productions.

Track listing

Personnel
Adapted from the Operator Dead... Post Abandoned liner notes.
Musicians
 Robert Beatty – Jew's harp (6), cover art
 Trevor Tremaine – guitar (4)
 C. Spencer Yeh – violin, electronics, recording
Production and additional personnel
 Steve Lowenthal – production
 Carl Saff – mastering

Release history

References

External links 
 
 Challenger at Bandcamp

2008 albums
Burning Star Core albums
Instrumental albums
Albums with cover art by Robert Beatty (artist)